René El Khazraje (born 11 September 1976 in Braunschweig), best known by his stage name MC Rene, is a German rapper and stand-up comedian.

Discography 
Albums
 1995: Renevolution
 1995: Renevolution Instrumentals
 1999: Reneflektion
 2000: Ein Album namens Bernd
 2002: Scheiß auf euren Hip Hop
 2005: Der Letzte Marokkaner
 2013: Alles auf eine Karte (feat. Carl Crinx; audiobook)
 2015: Renessance (feat. Carl Crinx; CD)
 2016: Khazraje

Singles
 1994: Die neue Reimgeneration (12")
 1994: Reimenergie (MCD/12")
 1995: Spüre diesen Groove (MCD/12")
 1995: Ein anderer Ausflug (MCD/12")
 1996: Ein anderer Ausflug (Stieber Twins Remix) (12")
 2000: Zieh dir das rein (MCD/12")
 2000: Ich würde alles für dich tun (MCD/12")
 2002: Pump up den Shit (MCD/12")
 2005: Reens Welt/Die Enthüllung (Remix) (MCD/12")

As a featured artist

Bibliography

References

External links
Official website
 

Living people
Musicians from Braunschweig
German rappers
German people of Moroccan descent
1976 births